The original The Twilight Zone anthology series began on October 2, 1959, and ended on June 19, 1964, with five seasons and 156 episodes. It was created by Rod Serling and broadcast on CBS.

Later popularity of the series brought about a 1983 feature film and three "revival" television series in 1985, 2002, and 2019, though none reached the same level of success as the original run.

Series overview

Episodes

Concept (1958)
Rod Serling wrote a teleplay intending for it to be the pilot episode of a new series called The Twilight Zone. Although it ended up airing on a different show, Westinghouse Desilu Playhouse, it is considered the seed episode and has even been adapted as one of The Twilight Zone radio-show episodes.

Pilot (1959)
The pilot episode for the series was called "Where is Everybody?" The episode was reformatted when included in the series.  It differs from the broadcast episode in only minor ways.

Season 1 (1959–60)

Note: Episode titles were not shown on screen, but were announced by Serling at the end of the preceding week's episode. "Where is Everybody?" is an exception, as it was the first episode. Serling's promotional announcements were stripped from syndicated versions of season one, but restored (often only in audio form) on the Image Entertainment DVD releases. They have since been fully restored on the Blu-ray releases.

Season 2 (1960–61)

Unlike season 1, episode titles were shown on screen during the end credits. 

Six consecutive episodes (production code #173-3662 through #173-3667) of this season were recorded on videotape (not on film as were all other episodes) at CBS Television City, as a cost-cutting measure mandated by CBS programming head James T. Aubrey. They are "The Lateness of the Hour", "The Night of the Meek", "The Whole Truth", "Twenty Two", "Static", and "Long Distance Call". These have a visual appearance which is distinctly different from those of episodes shot on film. In addition, videotape was a relatively primitive medium in the early 1960s; the editing of tape was next to impossible. Each of the episodes was therefore "camera-cut" as in live TV—on a studio sound stage, using a total of four cameras. The requisite multi-camera setup of the videotape experiment made location shooting difficult, severely limiting the potential scope of the storylines, so the short-lived experiment was abandoned.

"A Most Unusual Camera" was produced for season one.

Season 3 (1961–62)

Beginning with this season, episode titles were shown on screen after Serling's opening monologues. "The Grave" and "Nothing in the Dark" are the exceptions since they were produced for season two.

Season 4 (1963)

For season four, the series was lengthened to one hour and moved to Thursdays at 9:30 pm (Eastern Time), replacing Fair Exchange on the schedule.

Season 5 (1963–64)

In the fifth and final season, the series went back to a half-hour format, returned to a fall start, and aired Fridays at 9:30 pm (Eastern Time) on CBS.

Notes

External links
 Syfy.com
 The Original Twilight Zone Episode List
 Postcards from the Zone (Extensive episode guides for the 1980s series, including photos)
 The Twilight Zone Podcast (Audio reviews of every episode)

Twilight Zone
Twilight Zone